The 2003–04 Serbia and Montenegro Cup was the second and first full season of the Serbia and Montenegro's annual football cup. The cup defenders was FK Sartid, but was defeated by FK Obilić in the second round. Red Star Belgrade has the winner of the competition, after they defeated Budućnost Banatski Dvor. She later clinched the First League title to claim its 8th domestic double.

First round
Thirty-two teams entered in the First Round. The matches were played on 28, 29 October, 11 and 12 November 2003.

|}
Note: Roman numerals in brackets denote the league tier the clubs participated in the 2003–04 season.

Second round
The 16 winners from the prior round enter this round. The matches were played on 3 December 2003.

|}
Note: Roman numerals in brackets denote the league tier the clubs participated in the 2003–04 season.

Quarter-finals
The eight winners from the prior round enter this round. The matches were played on 3 and 24 March 2004.

|}
Note: Roman numerals in brackets denote the league tier the clubs participated in the 2003–04 season.

Semi-finals

Final

See also
 2003–04 First League of Serbia and Montenegro
 2003–04 Second League of Serbia and Montenegro

References

External links
Results on RSSSF

Serbia and Montenegro Cup
Cup
Cup
Serbia